A cam timer or drum sequencer is an electromechanical system for controlling a sequence of events automatically. It resembles a music box with movable pins, controlling electrical switches instead of musical notes.

Description
An electric motor drives a shaft on which is arranged a series of cams or a drum studded with pegs along its surface. Associated with each cam is one or more switches. The motor rotates at a fixed speed, and the camshaft is driven through a speed reducing gearbox at a convenient slow speed.  Indentations or protrusions on the cams operate the switches at different times. By arrangement of the cams and switches, complex sequences of opening and closing switches can be made. The switches then operate different elements of the controlled system - for example motors, valves, etc.

A programmer may change or rearrange (reprogram) peg or cam positions. Much like the pegs in a music box cylinder activate the notes, in a drum sequencer, as the drum of the sequencer spins, the pegs run across switches activating machine processes. The placement of the pegs along the length of the cylinder determine which switch along the length of the drum it will activate. Where the peg lies along the circular circumference of the drum determines at what point in the spin of the drum the peg will activate the switch. By controlling the timing and sequence of switches, the drum performs repetitive switching operations.  

Most cam timers use a miniature mains synchronous motor to rotate the mechanism at an accurate constant speed. Occasionally more complex timers with two motors are seen.

A drum sequencer is a re-programmable electromechanical timing device used to activate electric switches in repetitive sequences. Primarily, these sequencers were used in industrial applications to enable automated manufacturing processes.

Uses
Cam timers and drum sequencers were primarily used with industrial machines to control repetitive sequencing operations. The cam followers often operated hydraulic valves. Cam timers in industry were superseded with the introduction of programmable logic controllers (PLCs), which offer improved flexibility and more complicated control logic functions. In consumer products like washing machines, they were replaced with ASICs or microcontrollers. 

The most common use for cam timers is in automatic washing machines, where they are used to drive the washing sequence according to a pre-programmed pattern. They are gradually being superseded by microprocessor-controlled systems, which have greater versatility, and thus can more easily respond to various feedback.

Another example is the usage in electromechanical pinball machines, where the Cam timer is also known as a 'Score Motor'

Methods used to increase control
The most basic type of cam timer rotates continually, which is not suitable when needing to wait for events that occur at variable times.

With washing machine cam timers, it is necessary to wait a variable amount of time (for example waiting for a tank of water to heat up to a preset temperature). To achieve this, the cam motor subjects itself to control by one of its switches. The timer sequence switches the cam motor off, and the motor is started again by the signal from the thermostat when the required temperature is reached.

Usually washing machines thermostats have fewer fixed temperature detection points than the number of wash temperatures used. For intermediate temperatures, the cam mechanism uses the stop and wait method to heat to the nearest temp below the one desired, then uses only fixed timing of the heating element to increase the water to the desired temperature.

Some cam timers also have a fast forward mode, where applying power to a point on the controller causes rapid advance of the mechanism. This is often seen on washing machine controllers. Rapid advance can be achieved by moving of gearing, which may be triggered by various means.

Using feedback and external time delay and other sensory circuits, it is possible to build an electromechanical state machine using a cam timer. These are common in washing machines, where the cam timer runs in phases, but also stops and waits for external signals such as a fill level sensor, or a water heating temperature sensor.

Replacement with electronic controllers
While still fairly popular, cam timers are mechanical and hence subject to wear and reliability problems. Their reliability record remains good, but there is always some failure rate with mechanical switch contacts. 

Electronic controllers have largely replaced cam timers for most applications, primarily to reduce costs, and also to maximize product features.

Cam timers don't have the greater degree of flexibility that CPU-based controllers provide. As well as offering more wash program variations, a CPU based washing machine controller can respond to malfunctions, automatically initiate test cycles, reducing manufacturing costs, and provide fault codes in the field, again reducing repair costs, and providing feedback on real world failure rates and causes. All of these reduce manufacture and business costs.

See also
 Clock
 Drum machine (electronic musical instrument)
 Timer
 Player Piano (with a looped tape)
 :Category:Mechanical musical instruments – contains automatic playing musical instruments using pinned cylinders, etc.
 Pinball

External links
 Drum Sequencer

Electrical components
Control devices
Mechanisms (engineering)